Calliostoma kochi is a species of sea snail, a marine gastropod mollusk in the family Calliostomatidae.

Description
The size of the shell varies between 18 mm and 30 mm.

Distribution
This species occurs in the Mediterranean Sea off Morocco and Tangier

References

 Gofas, S.; Le Renard, J.; Bouchet, P. (2001). Mollusca, in: Costello, M.J. et al. (Ed.) (2001). European register of marine species: a check-list of the marine species in Europe and a bibliography of guides to their identification. Collection Patrimoines Naturels, 50: pp. 180–213 (

External links
Liste des mollusques testacés de la baie de Tanger. Journal de Conchyliologie 50: 1-39

kochi
Gastropods described in 1902